The 2014 American Athletic Conference baseball tournament was held at Bright House Field in Clearwater, Florida, from May 21 through 25. The event, held at the end of the conference regular season, determined the champion of the American Athletic Conference for the 2014 season.  Houston won the round-robin tournament and received the conference's automatic bid to the 2014 NCAA Division I baseball tournament.

Format and seeding
The top eight finishers from the regular season were seeded one through eight.  The tournament used a round-robin format, with the field divided into two groups.  The winners of each group, Louisville and Houston, faced off in a single championship game.  With nine teams in the league, the last-place regular season finisher, Cincinnati, was not in the field.

Bracket

All-Tournament Team
The following players were named to the All-Tournament Team.

Most Outstanding Player
Josh Vidales was named Tournament Most Outstanding Player.  Vidales was a second baseman for Houston.

References

Tournament
American Athletic Conference Baseball Tournament
Baseball competitions in Florida
American Athletic Conference baseball tournament
American Athletic Conference baseball tournament
College sports tournaments in Florida